EPOC may be:

 Excess post-exercise oxygen consumption
 Emotiv EPOC, consumer brain–computer interface devices for PC.
 EPOC (operating system), the precursor OS to the Symbian operating system
 Efficient Probabilistic Public-Key Encryption Scheme
 The Electric Power Optimization Centre
 EPoC - Ethernet passive optical network (EPON) Protocol over Coax

cs:EPOC
de:EPOC
it:EPOC
nl:EPOC
pl:EPOC
pt:EPOC
ru:EPOC
sv:EPOC